, more often known by his nickname of Shiggy Konno, was a noted figure in post-war rugby union in Japan for over fifty years. He was a strong advocate of amateurism in the game.

Biography
Konno was educated in England at Rokeby Preparatory School, and was a fluent English speaker. He attended Doshisha University At Doshisha, he played as a prop. Konno trained to be one of the last kamikaze pilots in World War II, but never flew a mission.

In 1952, Konno took his first job in rugby administration, acting as liaison for a touring Oxford University side. In 1968, Konno helped set up the Asian Rugby Football Union, being at various times Secretary General, Director, and Honorary Chairman. In 1969, he became Director of the Japan Rugby Football Union, and in 1972 its chairman, a position he held until 1994. He held various other posts in the JRFU until 2007. Between 1991 and 2000, Konno was Japan's representative on the International Rugby Board, the world governing body of the sport.

Konno-san was awarded an OBE in 1985 by Queen Elizabeth II, for his services to rugby, and also for helping improve Anglo-Japanese relations.

His funeral was held at Kōshōden in Zōjō-ji temple in Tokyo.

Honors
 In 2019, World Rugby inducted Konno to its Hall of Fame, alongside Richie McCaw, Os du Randt, Peter Fatialofa, Graham Henry, and Diego Ormaechea.

References

External links
 Wales rugby mourns Shiggy Konno
 Japan's rugby ambassador dies
 Shiggy Konno (HKRFU)

Japanese rugby union players
1922 births
2007 deaths
History of rugby union
Kamikaze pilots
Doshisha University alumni
Rugby union people in Japan
Rugby union executives
Honorary Members of the Order of the British Empire
Japanese expatriates in the United Kingdom